Distrianthes is a genus of flowering plants belonging to the family Loranthaceae.

Its native range is New Guinea.

Species:

Distrianthes exxonmobilensis 
Distrianthes molliflora

References

Loranthaceae
Loranthaceae genera